The 2009 Asian Tour was the 15th season of the modern Asian Tour, the main men's professional golf tour in Asia excluding Japan, since it was established in 1995. Prize money for the season exceeded US$39 million and Thongchai Jaidee topped the Order of Merit for the third time with US$981,932.

Schedule
The following table lists official events during the 2009 season.

Order of Merit
The Order of Merit was based on prize money won during the season, calculated in U.S. dollars.

Awards

Notes

References

External links
The Asian Tour's official English language site

Asian Tour
Asian Tour